Page 3, or Page Three, was a British newspaper convention of publishing a large image of a topless female glamour model (known as a Page 3 girl) on the third page of mainstream red-top tabloids. The Sun introduced the feature in November 1970, which boosted its readership and prompted competing tabloids—including the Daily Mirror, the Sunday People, and the Daily Star—to begin featuring topless models on their own third pages. Well-known Page 3 girls included Linda Lusardi, Samantha Fox, and Katie Price.
 
Although Page 3's defenders portrayed it as a harmless British cultural tradition, the feature was controversial throughout its history, drawing criticism both from conservatives, who tended to view it as softcore pornography inappropriate for inclusion in national newspapers, and feminists, who argued that Page 3 objectified women's bodies and perpetuated sexism. Some politicians, notably Clare Short and Caroline Lucas, campaigned to have Page 3 images banned from newspapers, although other politicians, including Nick Clegg and Ed Vaizey, expressed concern that such a ban would compromise press freedom. The British government never enacted legislation against Page 3. However, activists in 2012 launched the No More Page 3 campaign to persuade newspaper editors and owners to end the feature voluntarily.
 
In August 2013, The Suns Republic of Ireland edition replaced topless Page 3 girls with clothed glamour models. The Sun's UK print editions followed suit in January 2015, discontinuing Page 3 after more than 44 years. The Sun's official Page 3 website ceased publishing new content in March 2017 and was taken offline the following year. In April 2019, the Daily Star became the last print daily to move to a clothed glamour format, ending the Page 3 convention in Britain's mainstream tabloid press. As of 2023, the only British tabloid still publishing topless models is the niche Sunday Sport.

History
After Rupert Murdoch relaunched the loss-making Sun newspaper in tabloid format on 17 November 1969, editor Larry Lamb began to publish photographs of clothed glamour models on its third page to compete with The Suns principal rival, the Daily Mirror, which was then printing photos of models wearing lingerie or bikinis. The Suns first tabloid edition showed that month's Penthouse Pet, Ulla Lindstrom, wearing a suggestively unbuttoned shirt. Page 3 photographs over the following year were often provocative, but did not feature nudity until The Sun celebrated its first anniversary on 17 November 1970 by printing model Stephanie Khan in her "birthday suit" (i.e. in the nude). Sitting in a field, with one of her breasts fully visible from the side, Khan was photographed by Beverley Goodway, who became The Suns principal Page 3 photographer until he retired in 2003. Alison Webster took over Goodway's role in 2005 and remained until the feature was phased out. 
 
Page 3 was not a daily feature at the beginning of the 1970s, and The Sun only gradually began to feature Page 3 models in more overtly topless poses. Believing that Page 3 should feature "nice girls," Lamb sought to avoid the image of top-shelf pornography titles, and asked the Sun's female reporters to review Page 3 images to ensure women would not regard them as "dirty". Regardless, the feature, and the paper's other sexual content, led to some public libraries banning The Sun. A then Conservative-controlled council in Sowerby Bridge, Yorkshire took the first such decision, but reversed it after a series of local stunts organised by the newspaper and a change in the council's political orientation in 1971.
 
Page 3 is partly credited with boosting The Suns circulation. In the year after it introduced Page 3, its daily sales doubled to over 2.5 million, and it became the UK's bestselling newspaper by 1978. Competing tabloids, including the Daily Mirror, the Sunday People, and the Daily Star, also began publishing topless models to increase their own sales, although the Daily Mirror and the Sunday People discontinued the practice in the 1980s, calling the photographs demeaning to women. Page 3 launched the careers of many well-known British glamour models in the 1980s, including Debee Ashby, Donna Ewin, Samantha Fox, Kirsten Imrie, Kathy Lloyd, Gail McKenna, Suzanne Mizzi, and Maria Whittaker, some of whom were aged 16 or 17 when they started modeling for the feature. Fox, who began appearing on Page 3 as a 16-year-old in 1983, became one of the most-photographed British women of the 1980s, behind only Princess Diana and Margaret Thatcher. In 1986, David Sullivan launched the Sunday Sport, which featured numerous images of topless models throughout each edition. In 1988, The Sun launched "Page 7 Fella", which featured images of barechested male models. However, it did not gain popularity and was dropped in the 1990s.
 
In the mid-1990s, The Sun began printing Page 3 photographs were in colour as standard, rather than mostly in black and white. Captions to Page 3 images, which had previously contained sexually suggestive double entendre, were replaced by a listing of models' first names, ages, and hometowns. It later added a "News in Briefs" item that gave the model's thoughts on current affairs..After polling readers, The Sun in 1997 ceased featuring models who had undergone breast augmentation. In June 1999, it launched the official Page3.com website, which featured additional photos of current Page 3 models, archival images of former Page 3 models, and other related content.
 
Beginning in 2002, The Sun ran an annual contest called Page 3 Idol. Amateur models could submit photographs to be voted on by readers, with the winner receiving a cash prize and a Page 3 modeling contract. Page 3 Idol winners included Nicola T, Keeley Hazell, and Lucy Collett. 
 
In the UK, the Sexual Offences Act 2003 raised the minimum age for topless modelling from 16 to 18. This legal change meant that all topless images of 16- and 17-year-old models that had previously been published on Page 3 became potentially illegal content. 
 
In 2020, Channel 4 produced an hour-long documentary, Page Three: The Naked Truth, to mark 50 years since The Sun first introduced Page 3.

Publications 
 
 The Sun (1970s – January 2015)
 The Daily Mirror / Sunday People (1970s – 1980s)
 The Daily Star (1970s – April 2019)
 The Sunday Sport / Midweek Sport / Weekend Sport (1986 – present)
 The Daily Sport (1991 – April 2011)

Opposition
Page 3 was controversial and divisive throughout its history. Its defenders often characterised it as an inoffensive British cultural tradition, as when Conservative Party MP Richard Drax in 2013 called it a "national institution" that provided "light and harmless entertainment". Critics considered Page 3 images demeaning to women or as softcore pornography that should not be published in national newspapers readily available to children. Some politicians—notably Labour Party MPs Clare Short, Harriet Harman, and Stella Creasy, Liberal Democrat MP Lynne Featherstone, and Green Party MP Caroline Lucas—made efforts to have Page 3 removed from newspapers. Meanwhile, The Sun vigorously defended the feature. Typically representing Page 3's critics as prudes, spoilsports, or ideologues, it also routinely portrayed female critics as physically unattractive and jealous of its Page 3 girls. When Clare Short in 1986 tried to introduce a House of Commons bill banning topless models from British newspapers, The Sun ran a "Stop Crazy Clare" campaign, distributing free car stickers, calling Short a "killjoy", printing unflattering images of her, and polling readers on whether they would prefer to see Short's face or the back of a bus.
 
As a co-founder of Women in Journalism, Rebekah Brooks was reported to be personally offended by Page 3, and was widely expected to terminate it when she became The Suns first female editor in 2003. However, upon assuming her editorship, Brooks defended the feature, calling its models "intelligent, vibrant young women who appear in The Sun out of choice and because they enjoy the job". When Clare Short stated in a 2004 interview that she wanted to "take the pornography out of our press", saying "I'd love to ban [Page 3 because it] degrades women and our country", Brooks targeted Short with a "Hands Off Page 3" campaign that included printing an image of Short's face superimposed on a topless woman's body, calling Short "fat and jealous", and parking a double-decker bus with a delegation of Page 3 models outside Short's home. The Sun also called Harman a "feminist fanatic" and Featherstone a "battleaxe" for their opposition to Page 3. Brooks later said that she regretted The Suns "cruel and harsh" attacks on Short, listing them among the mistakes she had made as editor.
 
In February 2012, the Leveson Inquiry heard arguments for and against Page 3. Women's advocacy groups argued that Page 3 demeaned women and promoted sexist attitudes, but Sun editor Dominic Mohan called the feature an "innocuous British institution" that had become "part of British society". In his report, Lord Justice Leveson called Page 3 "a taste and decency issue" and stated that it thus fell outside his remit of investigating media ethics. Clare Short questioned Leveson's finding, stating: "Surely the depiction of half the population in a way that is now illegal on workplace walls and before the watershed in broadcasting, is an issue of media ethics?"
 
Lucy-Anne Holmes, a writer and actress from Brighton, began campaigning against Page 3 after noticing during the 2012 Summer Olympics that the largest photograph of a woman in the nation's best-selling newspaper was not of an Olympic athlete but of "a young woman in her knickers". Arguing that Page 3 perpetuated sexism, portrayed women as sex objects, negatively affected girls' and women's body image, and contributed to a culture of sexual violence, Holmes launched the No More Page 3 campaign in August of that year. The campaign collected over 240,000 signatures on an online petition and gained support from over 140 MPs, as well as a number of trade unions, universities, charities, and women's advocacy groups. It sponsored two women's soccer teams, Nottingham Forest Women F.C. and Cheltenham Town L.F.C., who played with the "No More Page 3" logo on their shirts. 
 
Lynne Featherstone called for a ban on Page 3 in September 2012, claiming that it contributed to domestic violence against women. However, then–deputy prime minister Nick Clegg expressed concern that banning the images would compromise freedom of the press, stating: "If you don't like it, don't buy it ... you don't want to have a moral policeman or woman in Whitehall telling people what they can and cannot see". In June 2013, Caroline Lucas defied parliamentary dress code by wearing a "No More Page Three" T-shirt during a House of Commons debate on media sexism. She stated: "If Page 3 still hasn't been removed from The Sun by the end of [2013], I think we should be asking the government to step in and legislate". Culture minister Ed Vaizey responded that the government did not plan to regulate the content of the press, saying that adults had the right to choose what they read. Then–prime minister David Cameron also declined to support a ban on Page 3, stating during an interview with BBC Radio 4's Woman's Hour: "This is an area where we should leave it to consumers to decide, rather than to regulators". After becoming The Sun's editor in June 2013, David Dinsmore confirmed he would continue printing photographs of topless models, calling it "a good way of selling newspapers".

End of the feature
In February 2013, Rupert Murdoch suggested on Twitter that The Sun could transition to a "halfway house," featuring glamour photographs without showing nudity. Six months later, in August 2013, The Suns Republic of Ireland editor Paul Clarkson replaced topless Page 3 girls with clothed glamour models in that edition, citing cultural differences between the UK and Ireland. Tho No More Page 3 campaign thanked Clarkson "for taking the lead in the dismantling of a sexist institution", called the decision "a huge step in the right direction," and asked David Dinsmore to follow suit with The Sun's UK editions.
 
After publishing Page 3 for over 44 years, The Sun on 17 January 2015 began featuring images of women wearing lingerie and bikinis on its third page. On 20 January, The Times, another Murdoch title, reported that the tabloid was "quietly dropping one of the most controversial traditions of British journalism". The decision to discontinue Page 3 received significant media attention. On 22 January, The Sun appeared to change course, publishing a Page 3 image of a winking model with her breasts fully exposed and a caption mocking those who had commented on the end of the feature. However, The Sun did not feature Page 3 thereafter.
 
Longtime campaigner Clare Short called the decision to terminate the feature "an important public victory for dignity", while Nicky Morgan, then Minister for Women and Equalities, called it "a small but significant step towards improving the media portrayal of women and girls". A spokeswoman for the No More Page 3 campaign called it "truly historic news" and "a huge step for challenging media sexism”. However, Caroline Lucas criticized the transition to clothed glamour, saying: "So long as The Sun reserves its right to print the odd topless shot, and reserves its infamous page for girls clad in bikinis, the conversation isn't over". 
 
Some former Page 3 models defended the feature and the women who had appeared in it. Model Nicola McLean appeared on ITV's Good Morning Britain, calling Page 3 models "strong-minded women" who "certainly don't feel like we have been victimised". In a televised debate with Harman and Germaine Greer, model Chloe Goodman challenged the other participants, asking "Why should feminist women tell other women how to live their lives?" Harman responded: "In a hundred years' time, if you look back at the newspapers of this country, and you see women standing in their knickers with their breasts showing, what would you think about women's role in society?" Separately, Debee Ashby, who had first appeared on Page 3 as a 16-year-old in the 1980s, called its cancellation long overdue.
 
Despite abolishing the feature in its print editions, The Sun continued publishing topless images on its official Page3.com website until March 2017. No new online content appeared after that point, and the website was taken offline in 2018. In April 2019, the Daily Star shifted to a clothed glamour format, becoming the last mainstream print daily to discontinue printing topless images. This ended the tradition in the mainstream British press, with only the niche Sunday Sport continuing to publish topless images in tabloid format as of 2023.

Notable Page 3 models

 
Born 1991 onwards

 Danielle Sharp

 
Born 1986–1990

 Sylvia Barrie
 Lucy Collett
 Cherry Dee
 Amy Diamond
 Katie Green
 Keeley Hazell
 Katia Ivanova
 Holly Peers
 India Reynolds
 Peta Todd
 Madison Welch
 Chelsea White
 Iga Wyrwal
 Chloe Goodman

 
Born 1981–1985

 Sam Cooke
 Katie Downes
 Amii Grove
 Sophie Howard
 Sarah Maple
 Michelle Marsh
 Nicola McLean
 Natasha Mealey
 Lucy Pinder
 Lauren Pope
 Nicola Tappenden
 Claire Tully

 
Born 1971–1980

 Jakki Degg
 Leilani Dowding
 Joanne Guest
 Geri Halliwell
 Ruth Higham
 Jordan
 Jodie Marsh
 Nell McAndrew
 Linsey Dawn McKenzie
 Melinda Messenger
 Jayne Middlemiss
 Rachel Ter Horst
 Kelly Brook
 Sarah Louise Young

 
Born 1961–1970

 Melanie Appleby
 Debee Ashby
 Marina Baker
 Deborah Corrigan
 Donna Ewin
 Samantha Fox
 Kirsten Imrie
 Kathy Lloyd
 Gail McKenna
 Suzanne Mizzi
 Corinne Russell
 Gail Thackray
 Maria Whittaker

 
Born 1951–1960

 Sian Adey-Jones
 Nina Carter
 Cherri Gilham
 Penny Irving
 Jilly Johnson
 Joanne Latham
 Linda Lusardi
 Carol Needhamn
 Tula

 
Born 1941–1950

 Flanagan
 Vicki Hodge
 Stephanie Marrian

See also

 Page 3 culture
 Hot Shots Calendar
 Lad culture
 Lad mags

References

Bibliography

External links
 Page Three girls – the naked truth from the BBC website
 

 
 
1970 introductions
The Sun (United Kingdom)
Sociological terminology
Popular culture language
Journalism terminology
Nude photography
Nudity in print media
Sexism in the United Kingdom
Mass media and entertainment controversies
 
no:Side 3-piken